Bruchsal – Schwetzingen is an electoral constituency (German: Wahlkreis) represented in the Bundestag. It elects one member via first-past-the-post voting. Under the current constituency numbering system, it is designated as constituency 278. It is located in northwestern Baden-Württemberg, comprising the northern part of the Landkreis Karlsruhe district and western parts of the Rhein-Neckar-Kreis district.

Bruchsal – Schwetzingen was created for the 2002 federal election. Since 2002, it has been represented by Olav Gutting of the Christian Democratic Union (CDU).

Geography
Bruchsal – Schwetzingen is located in northwestern Baden-Württemberg. As of the 2021 federal election, it comprises the municipalities of Bad Schönborn, Bruchsal, Forst, Hambrücken, Karlsdorf-Neuthard, Kronau, Oberhausen-Rheinhausen, Östringen, Philippsburg, Ubstadt-Weiher, and Waghäusel from the Landkreis Karlsruhe district and the municipalities of Altlußheim, Brühl, Hockenheim, Ketsch, Neulußheim, Oftersheim, Plankstadt, Reilingen, and Schwetzingen from the Rhein-Neckar-Kreis district.

History
Bruchsal – Schwetzingen was created in 2002 and contained parts of the redistributed constituencies of Karlsruhe-Land and Heidelberg. In the 2002 and 2005 elections, it was constituency 279 in the numbering system. Since the 2009 election, it has been number 278. Its borders have not changed since its creation.

Members
The constituency has been represented by Olav Gutting of the Christian Democratic Union (CDU) since its creation.

Election results

2021 election

2017 election

2013 election

2009 election

References

Federal electoral districts in Baden-Württemberg
2002 establishments in Germany
Constituencies established in 2002
Karlsruhe (district)
Rhein-Neckar-Kreis